A limited-edition book is a book released in a limited-quantity print run, usually fewer than 1000 copies (much smaller than publishing-industry standards). The term connotes scarcity or exclusivity. The higher the quantity printed the less likely the book will become scarce and thus increase in value. Limited editions were introduced by publishers in the late 19th century. 

The term also implies that no further additional printings of the book with the same design treatment will take place, unlike open-ended trade editions wherein further copies may be released in more print runs as the first and subsequent printings sell out.

Limited-edition books may also be numbered or lettered to distinguish in that set each book. For example, a numbered, limited book could have a marking such as "Copy 1 of a limited edition of 250 copies" or "1/250". Much less common is the lettered limited-edition book that could have denotations such as "1 of 26" or "1/26" or "A of 26" or "Copy A", etc. Sometimes a copy of a limited-edition book is stated as being "out of series": this is an unnumbered copy, often a review copy.

Limited-edition books are also sometimes signed by the author, illustrator and/or other contributors to make them more exclusive and collectible. In some instances, the limited-edition version contains additional material not found in the mass-market (or trade) version of the book. Likewise, they are sometimes housed in slipcases.

See also
Collecting
Book collecting

References

Books by type
Book collecting